Il mammo is an Italian sitcom.

Cast
Enzo Iacchetti: Silvano Zerbi
Natalia Estrada: Patty Morales Miranda
Elisa Triani: Ginevra
Federica Citarella: Raffaella Zerbi
Luca Annovazzi: Luca Zerbi
Francesca Di Cara: Linda Zerbi
Antonio Petrocelli: Pierpaolo
Rossana Carretto: Giada Coletti

See also
List of Italian television series

External links
 

Italian comedy television series
2004 Italian television series debuts
2007 Italian television series endings
Canale 5 original programming